Idunella is a genus of crustacean in family Liljeborgiidae. It contains the following species:
Idunella aequicornis (Sars, 1876)
Idunella excavata (Schecke, 1973)
Idunella longirostris (Chevreux, 1920)
Idunella nana (Schecke, 1973)
Idunella pirata Krapp-Schickel, 1975
Idunella sketi Karaman, 1980

References

Gammaridea
Taxonomy articles created by Polbot